The Apostolic Nunciature to El Salvador is an ecclesiastical office of the Catholic Church in El Salvador. It is a diplomatic post of the Holy See, whose representative is called the Apostolic Nuncio with the rank of an ambassador. The nuncio resides in San Salvador.

List of papal representatives to El Salvador 
Apostolic Delegates and Internuncios
Giovanni Battista Marenco (15 September 1920 – 22 October 1921)
Angelo Rotta (16 October 1922 – 9 May 1925)
Giuseppe Fietta (27 February 1926 – 23 September 1930)
Carlo Chiarlo (28 January 1932 – 30 September 1933)
Apostolic Nuncios
Albert Levame (21 December 1933 - 12 November 1939)
Giuseppe Beltrami (20 February 1940 - 15 November 1945)
Giovanni Castellani (18 December 1945 - 23 August 1951)
Gennaro Verolino (5 September 1951 - 25 February 1957)
Giuseppe Paupini (25 February 1957 - 23 May 1959)
Ambrogio Marchioni (1 July 1959 - 1 September 1964)
Bruno Torpigliani (1 September 1964 - 3 August 1968)
Girolamo Prigione (27 August 1968 - 2 October 1973)
Emanuele Gerada (8 November 1973 - 15 October 1980)
Lajos Kada (15 October 1980 - 8 April 1984)
Francesco De Nittis (24 January 1985 - 25 June 1990)
Manuel Monteiro de Castro (21 August 1990 - 2 February 1998)
Giacinto Berloco (5 May 1998 - 24 February 2005)
Luigi Pezzuto (2 April 2005 - 17 November 2012)
Léon Kalenga Badikebele (22 February 2013 - 17 March 2018)
Santo Rocco Gangemi (25 May 2018 – 12 September 2022)
Luigi Roberto Cona (26 October 2022 – present)

Notes

References

 
El Salvador